Kevin Christopher Hansen (born March 19, 1982) is an American volleyball player. He made his Olympic debut at the 2008 Summer Olympics with the U.S. national team.

Personal life
Hansen was born and raised in Newport Beach, California. He attended high school at Corona del Mar and was named the California Interscholastic Federation (CIF) Most Valuable Player in 2000 and led the volleyball team to the CIF Division I Championship the same season.

Hansen is a type I diabetic, first diagnosed when he was 10 years old, and must inject himself with insulin at least four times a day.

College
Hansen continued on to Stanford University from 2000-2005 (as he redshirted his freshman year), and majored in economics.

He finished his career third on Stanford's list of career leaders with 5,036 assists, thus becoming just the third player in Stanford men's volleyball history to eclipse 5,000 career assists. He was an American Volleyball Coaches Association (AVCA) First-Team All-American as a fifth year senior in 2005.

U.S. national team
Hansen joined the U.S. national team in June 2005, primarily as the backup setter to veteran Lloy Ball.

International competition
In 2008, he played at the FIVB World League, where Team USA won the gold medal. In 2007, he participated in Americas' Cup, earning a gold medal, the Pan American Games, earning a silver medal, and the FIVB World League, earning a bronze medal. His first major international competition was in 2005 at the World University Games.

Olympics
Hansen made his Olympic debut at the 2008 Summer Olympics.

References

External links
 

1982 births
Living people
Sportspeople from Newport Beach, California
American men's volleyball players
Olympic gold medalists for the United States in volleyball
Volleyball players at the 2008 Summer Olympics
Stanford University alumni
Stanford Cardinal men's volleyball players
Volleyball players at the 2007 Pan American Games
PAOK V.C. players
Medalists at the 2008 Summer Olympics
Pan American Games silver medalists for the United States
Pan American Games medalists in volleyball
People with type 1 diabetes
Medalists at the 2007 Pan American Games
Setters (volleyball)